The 2016 Auto GP Formula Open was the seventh and final year of the Auto GP, and the seventeenth season of the former Euroseries 3000. The championship was due to on 9 April at Misano and should have finished on 16 October in Mugello after six double-header rounds. For the first round, the championship was open to all the single-seaters from 2 to 4 liters, such as Formula One, GP2, World Series, International Formula 3000, Formula Masters and Formula 3 cars. After the first round, Auto GP merged with the BOSS GP Series due to a number of teams and drivers moving over.

Teams and drivers

Calendar
The provisional calendar for the 2016 season was released on 24 November 2015. Originally all races were scheduled to be held in Italy, but a round at the Nürburgring was later added, only to be cancelled days ahead of being held due to an excess of noise, according to Mexican driver Luis Michael Dörrbecker. Auto GP did not release any news on the issue. Following that, the series was integrated into the BOSS GP Series, where it has its own category as well as being part of the BOSS GP Formula class.

Championship standings

 Points were awarded as follows:

Drivers' championship

Teams' championship

References

External links
 

Auto GP
Auto GP
Auto GP